Acianthera  capillaris is a species of orchid plant native to Bolivia, Brazil, Colombia, Ecuador, Paraguay, Venezuela, the Venezuelan Antilles, and the Windward Islands.

References 

capillaris
Flora of Bolivia
Flora of Brazil
Flora of Colombia
Flora of Ecuador
Flora of Paraguay
Flora of Venezuela
Flora of the Venezuelan Antilles
Flora of the Windward Islands